Biddeston is a rural town and locality in the Toowoomba Region, Queensland, Australia. In the  the locality of Biddeston had a population of 284 people.

History

Crosshill State School opened on 9 August 1880 and closed on 1940.

A postal receiving office opened on 1 February 1882 and was upgraded to a post office on 1 July 1927. During that time it was run by the Anderson family of Biddeston Farm, which is probably the origin of the district name. The post office closed on 5 January 1965.

The town reserve was established on 26 August 1890.

In 1880, a 10-acre block of land on the Oakey-Southbrook Road was aside for a school. However, it was not until 14 October 1919 that the Biddeston State School finally opened, but with only a tent for a schoolroom for the 14 children enrolled under teacher Margaret Cecilla Cloherty Anderson. It was not until 10 October 1921 that the Education Department built a one-room timber building to replace the tent. Despite growing enrolment numbers, the Education Department would not enlarge the building apart from the addition of a verandah in 1927. It was not until 1954 that a second school room was built. A pre-school was added in 1986.

In the 2011 census, Biddeston had a population of 328 people.

Biddeston was the site of the Biddeston Murders that took place on 2 March 2015 when a grandfather killed his pregnant daughter and grandson.

In the  the locality of Biddeston had a population of 284 people.

Road infrastructure
The Toowoomba–Cecil Plains Road runs through from east to west.

Economy 
There are a number of homesteads in the locality:

 Aberdeen
 Aughamore
 Bronte Park
 Burton
 Chelandry
 Croxley
 Egmont Park
 Enterprise
 Glen Bride
 Glen View
 Goldrush Lodge
 Hillview
 Kerrabee Park
 Lange
 Martrise
 Mayfield
 Parklands
 Rayhill
 Roxanna
 Silver Springs
 The Towers
 Wallaby Hill
 Windemere
 Ziebel

Education

Biddeston State School is a government primary (Prep-6) school for boys and girls at 2425 Cecil Plains Road. In 2017, the school had an enrolment of 61 students with 5 teachers (4 full-time equivalent) and 6 non-teaching staff (3 full-time equivalent). In 2018, the school had an enrolment of 70 students with 6 teachers (4 full-time equivalent) and 6 non-teaching staff (3 full-time equivalent).

There is no secondary schools in Biddeston. The nearest government secondary school is Oakey State High School in neighbouring Oakey to the north.

Events
The Biddeston Tractor Pull is an annual event in which restored and modified tractors compete to pull heavy loads.

References

Further reading

External links

 

Toowoomba Region
Localities in Queensland
Towns in Queensland